Pennridge School District is located approximately  north of Philadelphia in Bucks County, Pennsylvania.

The district
Bedminster, East Rockhill, Hilltown, and West Rockhill townships also are included.

Foundations and current schools
Pennridge was founded in 1952 by combining the resources of several small municipal school districts, including Sell-Perk School District. The former Sell-Perk High School had been converted to its present use as South Middle School. Today, the district operates 11 schools:

7 elementary schools (of which four are named for past principals):
Bedminster
R. B. Deibler
J. M. Grasse
P. A. Guth
Sellersville
M. M. Seylar
West Rockhill

3 middle schools:
Central Middle School
South Middle School -the building of the original area high school (Sell-Perk High School) 
North Middle School

1 high school:
Pennridge High School

Right now there are approximately 7,200 students enrolled in the entire district. The district employs 478 teachers and over 450 additional staff, including part-time members.

Athletics
All Pennridge School sports compete in the Suburban One League - Continental Conference using the ram as a mascot and green, white and occasionally black for colors. The Varsity Football team historically plays all of their home games at Poppy Yoder Field, a stadium on the grounds of South Middle School. South was formerly known as Sell-Perk High (before Pennridge was formed) and still has its roots embedded in the community. Since October 2008, a turf field has been in use on the grounds of the high school. Lacrosse, soccer, field hockey, track and field, and JV and freshmen football use the turf field. However, the Varsity Football team continues to play at muddy Poppy Yoder in Sellersville, Pennsylvania. There have been talks to renovate Poppy Yoder and possibly complete the stadium at the high school. Poppy Yoder field is no longer in use and now the football team and other high school sports play at Helman Field which is located behind the high school.
In recent years, many of the sport teams have had great success. The women's soccer team was conference and District 1 champions in 2011. They were also PIAA Class AAA State Runners-up. In 2009 they were District 1 Champions. The boys' volleyball team was also conference champions, District 1 champions, and PIAA Class AAA State Runners-up. In 2022, the boy's ice hockey team was the SHSHL Varsity AA Champions.

Growth and development
Pennridge’s administration has had to be very adaptable in recent years as the Pennridge area population continues to grow as an ongoing effect of urban sprawl from Philadelphia. In 1996 the new Central Middle School was added to accommodate rising enrollments and since then, most of the district's elementary schools have undergone expansion and renovation projects. 
Pennridge has recently built a multimillion-dollar expansion to the current building on the high school campus, which includes a new gymnasium, natatorium, and cafeteria. Construction of a new auditorium, seating approximately 1200, and renovation of the school's older sections, followed, being completed February 2007. Demolition of the oldest building on campus, the Lower House, began on August 15, 2006 due to the futility of renovation. The building that was the Freshman Center became North Middle School after the High School construction was completed.

National attention was briefly drawn to Pennridge School District in 2018 as 225 students walked out March, 2018 to honor the dead from the Marjory Stoneman Douglas High School shooting and call for stricter gun laws.  The district gave Saturday detentions to these students, who then used the occasion to stage further protests which garnered widespread attention.

Notable alumni
Jake Crouthamel, former Syracuse University athletic director
Paul Clymer, PA House of Representatives
Tom Fulp, Newgrounds creator
Sam Hollenbach, Former NFL player
Robb Riddick, former NFL player 
Louis Riddick, former NFL player and current ESPN Analyst
Tim Lewis, former NFL player and current NFL assistant coach
Saige Martin, artist and politician
Bill Mensch, founder, chairman and CEO of the Western Design Center 
Dean Sabatino, The Dead Milkmen drummer
Chris Collingwood, Fountains of Wayne lead singer
Will Lewis, former NFL Player and Vice President of Football Operations for the Seattle Seahawks
Beverly Lynne, Hard-core film actress
Ryan Zamroz, former basketball player
Brittany Furlan, Internet personality

References

External links
 
 Map of Pennridge School District

School districts established in 1952
School districts in Bucks County, Pennsylvania
1952 establishments in Pennsylvania